The 1956-57 Oberliga season was the ninth season of the Oberliga, the top level of ice hockey in Germany. 11 teams participated in the league, and EV Füssen won the championship.

First round

West Group

South Group

Final round

Relegation 
Preußen Krefeld – Berliner Schlittschuhclub 6:2

References

Oberliga (ice hockey) seasons
West
Ger